Josef Turnovský (born 1922) was a Czech international table tennis player.

Turnovský won a bronze medal at the 1950 World Table Tennis Championships in the men's doubles with Václav Tereba.

He was a worker at the Stalin Works at Horni Litvinov, near Most.

See also
 List of table tennis players
 List of World Table Tennis Championships medalists

References

1922 births
Possibly living people
Czech male table tennis players
World Table Tennis Championships medalists